Roger Tancred Robert Hawkins GLM ICD (25 April 1915 – 3 March 1980) was a Rhodesian politician and member of Ian Smith’s cabinet in the years following Rhodesia's Unilateral Declaration of Independence. He was one of the founder members of the Rhodesian Front.

Life

Roger Tancred Robert Hawkins was born in Letchworth, England on 25 April 1915.  He was the son of Harry Bradford Tancred Hawkins and was educated at Bedford Modern School and King's College London.  

At the outbreak of World War II, Hawkins served with the Rhodesian Forces in 1939 and received his commission in Cairo in 1940. He joined the 1st Battalion, Northern Rhodesia Regiment in 1941 and served in East Africa, Ceylon and Burma.  

After the war, Hawkins pursued business interests and, before entering politics, was an acknowledged mining expert and owner in Selukwe where Ian Smith was also a prominent farmer. He was elected President of the Rhodesian Mining Federation, became increasingly involved in political affairs and was one of the founder members of the Rhodesian Front. Following the resignation of Clifford Dupont, Hawkins was elected to the Southern Rhodesian Legislative Assembly on 15 September 1964 as Member of Parliament for Charter.

In 1970, Hawkins was appointed Minister of Transport in Smith's Cabinet. He was sworn in on 13 April 1970. On 11 March 1977, at the height of the Rhodesian Bush War, Smith appointed him Minister of the newly created Ministry of Combined Operations. Hawkins also held the position of Minister of Defence.

Hawkins resigned from the Rhodesian Cabinet in November 1978 on the grounds of ill health. He died in Selukwe at the age of 64 on 3 March 1980.

References

1915 births
1980 deaths
Members of the Parliament of Rhodesia
Members of the Legislative Assembly of Southern Rhodesia
Rhodesian Front politicians
Rhodesian politicians
Alumni of King's College London
People educated at Bedford Modern School
People from Letchworth
Zimbabwean people of English descent
White Rhodesian people
British emigrants to Rhodesia
People from Midlands Province
Defence Ministers of Zimbabwe